The Katahdin is a breed of domestic sheep developed by breeder Michael Piel in Maine, United States. He named this new breed after Mount Katahdin - the state’s highest peak. The breed was developed during the second half of the 20th century by crossing selected St. Croix sheep from the Virgin Islands with various other breeds, including the Suffolk. Lambs were selected based on hair coat, meat-type conformation, high fertility, and flocking instinct.

The Katahdin sheep breed was the first in the United States to reach sheep industry standards of carcass quality.The average Katahdin ewe weight is 120 to 160 pounds and the ram's weight is 180 to 250. Most Katahdin ewes will have a 200% lamb crop. The Katahdin sheds its winter coat, so does not have to be sheared. The Katahdin's hair comes in a variety of colors, as the emphasis of the breed is on production rather than appearance. When Katahdins are crossed with wool sheep, their offspring usually have a predominantly wool coat with some hair mixed in.

The Katahdin's popularity in the USA has increased in recent years due to low wool prices and high shearing costs. This, combined with the fact that the Katahdin sheep breed is also resistant to parasites - a trait inherited from its St. Croix ancestors - makes the breed a highly productive, low-cost option for commercial shepherds.

References

External links 

 Katahdin at Oklahoma State University
Katahdin at Sheep 101.info

Sheep breeds
Sheep breeds originating in the United States